Taylor Hearn may refer to:

 Taylor Hearn (baseball) (born 1994), pitcher
 Taylor Hearn (American football) (born 1996), guard